Maria Kalomira Sarantis (born January 31, 1985), known professionally as Kalomira (sometimes transliterated as Kalomoira), is a Greek-American singer, songwriter, model, television personality and host. Born and raised on Long Island, just outside of New York City in the United States, she first came to prominence in Greece in 2004, after winning the Greek talent show Fame Story. She has subsequently released four studio albums, represented Greece in the Eurovision Song Contest 2008, and hosted various television shows.

Early life
Kalomira, was born Maria Kalomira Sarantis on January 31, 1985, in West Hempstead, New York on Long Island. Known to her immediate family as Carol (her childhood nickname), her parents are Greek restaurant owners Nikos and Eleni Sarantis. Since childhood, she had the ambition to become a pop star.  She played the viola, which she studied for nine years and played in the school orchestra. She was also Miss West Hempstead (Homecoming Queen) at her high school in 2003. In 2003, she entered and won second place at a music contest organized by WBLI Radio. Following her appearance, she opened up several live shows with famous American artists, such as Jessica Simpson, LL Cool J, Jennifer Love Hewitt, Michelle Branch, and Nick Lachey.

Career
Kalomira entered the New York City auditions for Antenna's reality singing competition Fame Story 2, which was a licensed variant of the Star Academy franchise. She was one of two selected from over 200 auditions in New York. Despite speaking primarily English, and not speaking Greek fluently, Kalomira went to Greece after having completed one semester of college at Adelphi University where she was a music major with a scholarship. Kalomira placed first and her professional singing career began. Kalomira won the contest, earned 200,000 Euros and a recording contract with Heaven Music

2004–2006: First albums and television

Kalomira performed in Thessaloniki’s FOCUS from July 8 to August 14. While entertaining audiences by night, she was recording her first album by day. Outside of Greece, Kalomira has appeared on NBC’s "Today Show" and "Access Hollywood" during the events of the 2004 Summer Olympics in Athens, UPN's Greek Parade where she sang live and was interviewed, Fox News, was in the "Washington Post", "Newsday" and "New York Times" and most currently featured on Oprah for her Eurovision Performance, along with a number of other shows and websites. On September 1, 2004, Kalomira released her 15-track first album Kalomira, which went gold. She then toured Greece accompanied by the rest of the "Fame Story" participants with appearances in Athens's "Thalassa". In the same year, she closed her season at the REX studio with Despina Vandi and Thanos Petrelis. Kalomira received good reviews from critics and was awarded "Woman of the Year – Best Newcomer" by Life and Style magazine. Also in 2004, she had a minor credited role in the longest-running Greek TV drama series Lampsi, playing the part of Jennifer Drakou for 30 episodes, where veteran director Nikos Foskolos compared her to Aliki Vougiouklaki. Also, Kalomira performed twice in Herodium theatre like a surprise cake for Dionysis Savvopoulos's birthday and she sang Marilyn Monroe's song, "Happy Birthday Mr. President".

In 2005, Kalomira released her second album titled Paizeis? (You Playing?) with 12 songs, of which two were written and composed by her. She also agreed to appear with Elli Kokkinou, Andreas Stamos and Constantinos Christoforou at the Piraeus 130 music club. In her program, she included covers of songs such as "Scandalous," "Don't Cha" and "Don't Phunk with My Heart," in addition to songs from her first and second albums. On April 11, 2005, she was a special guest on the first live concert of the first season of Star Academy Bulgaria.

In the fall of 2006, Kalomira became the female co-hostess on the hit Sunday night show Pio Poli Tin Kiriaki alongside Grigoris Arnaoutoglou on Mega Channel. In December, she released her third CD I Kalomira Paei Cinema (Kalomira Goes to the Cinema).

2007–2009: Eurovision Song Contest and new album

At the end of 2007, Heaven Music chose Kalomira to be their contestant in the 2008 National Final to represent Greece in the Eurovision Song Contest 2008. Kalomira picked an R&B style upbeat song with a Greek feel composed by Konstantinos Pantzis with lyrics by Poseidonas Giannopoulos titled "Secret Combination". The song has an "American production" feel to it. On February 27, 2008, Kalomira won the National Final with "Secret Combination" and represented Greece in the Eurovision Song Contest 2008. To promote the song, Kalomira had a pre-Eurovision tour and visited several Eurovision countries throughout March and April.

In the first semifinal, held on May 20, 2008, Kalomira fared well, coming in first place while at the Eurovision final, on May 24, she came in third behind Russia and Ukraine, with 218 points. In an interview with Eleni Menegaki, she said that above all she wanted the Greek people to be proud of the performance.

Kalomira announced on her online diary that she recorded her new album during September and October 2007 in Greece. The album, named Secret Combination the Album, was released on May 29, 2008, and contained songs in both Greek and English, including her Eurovision entry "Secret Combination". There is also a bonus rap remix of "Secret Combination" by Master Tempo. The writers are Konstantinos Pantzis, Tasos Vougiatzis and Sunny X. Kalomira did not participate in the promotion of the album, due to a dispute with Heaven Music. She focused on presenting TV shows, including the Greek version of the game show Big in Japan which took place in Japan and featured 12 contestants.

2010–2014: Digital singles and tours 

In January 2010, it was announced that Kalomira would be featured in a series of advertisements as the main spokesperson promoting Domino's Pizza in Greece. In March 2010, Kalomira renewed her contract with Heaven Music. Her next single was called "Please Don't Break My Heart", which featured American rapper, Fatman Scoop. The video was filmed in Turkey and the song premiered on Rythmos 94.9.

In June 2011, Kalomira released her most recent and last pop song of Heaven Music, called "This Is The Time'" while a music video premiered in July. On December 31, Kalomira did a concert for a charite causes, "Bring in 2012 with Kalomira!", for Greek Orthodox people in Washington DC.  On February 22, 2012, her new single was released, only for husband's music company "Hot Kiss Records LLC", and is called "Other Side Tonight". The song was written by GMoney and Jeremy Beaber. On 2 March, Kalomira was presented with Australia's comedian actor Angelo Tsarouchas, a beauty pageant Greek Beauty Pageant - Kalistia 2012 in Canada.

On October 17, 2013, Kalomira came back after her break, as she had given birth to two boys. In March 2014, Kalomira came back to Greece after 2 and a half years since her last appearance. She gave many interviews on television and magazines, and she sang as a guest star with Claydee Lupa the new version of "Secret Combination", in the national final of Greece's entry in the Eurovision Song Contest 2014.

She started to do a concert tour in USA. The first stop was on June 3, 2014,in a football game for Greece and Nigeria in Philadelphia, where she sang the Greek national anthem and many songs. On June 6, she performed for the first time in Baltimore in the concert "St. Nicholas Greek Folk Festival 2014 featuring: Kalomira!". On July 23, she performed in New York City in the concert "The Loukoumi make a difference foundation". She performed with Anna Vissi, Gloria Gaynor, Constantine Maroulis and Olympia Doukakis.

In a recent interview, Kalomira said that she started her music career when she was eighteen and half years old. She has expressed herself through her music over a span of more than 10 years. Her music describes what she has gone through in her life.

2015–present: New music and Rising Star

In the summer of 2015, Kalomira made a hot appearance on MAD VMA 2015 performing a new summer song titled "This Is Summer" released by Panik Records. In parallel she gave some TV interviews and left for USA until 2016 when she gave birth to her third child, a girl. In December 2016, she decided to make the highly anticipated Christmas single titled "Ayta Ta Hristougenna" / "Christmas Time" by her previous record label Heaven Music. Kalomira took participated as a TV presenter at the backstage of the new music talent show Rising Star.

Personal life
In 2010, she married real estate developer George Boosalis on September 26 at Saint Paul Greek Orthodox Cathedral in Hempstead, New York. In December 2012 Kalomira gave birth to two twin boys. Four years later, in July 2016, she gave birth to a girl.

Discography
All the albums listed underneath were released and charted in Greece and Cyprus.

Studio albums

Compilation album

Soundtrack album

Singles as lead artist

Singles as featured artist

Promotional singles

Other charted singles

Video album

Filmography

Television

Web

Commercials

Theater

Music videos

Lyric videos

Tours and residencies

Concert tours
Headlining
 Summer Concerts (2006)
 Greek Concerts (2007)
 Secret Combination: The Eurovision Promo Tour (2008)
 Kalomira 2008 US Summer Tour (2008)
 North America Club Tour (2009)
 Greek & Cypriot Summer Tour (2011)
 USA Concerts (2011-2012)
 Kalomira USA Tour (2014)

Joint
 Fame Story Tour (with the contestants of the Fame Story 2) (2004)
 Despina Vandi - Kalomira - Yorgos Christou Live Tour (2005)
 USA Festivals (variously concerts; some of the artists was Gloria Gaynor, Anna Vissi, Yorgos Margaritis, Glykeria, Stelios Dionisiou) (2013-2014)

Concert residencies

 
Secondary act
 Rex (with Despina Vandi, Thanos Petrelis, Yorgos Christou) (2004-2005)
 Palais de Sports (with Despina Vandi, Yorgos Christou) (2005)
 Pyli Axiou (with Despina Vandi, Thanos Petrelis, Yorgos Christou) (2004-2005)
 Odos Peiraios 130 (with Elli Kokkinou, Andreas Stamos, Chryspa, Constantinos Christoforou) (2005-2006)
 Fever (with Nikos Makropoulos, Angeliki Iliadi, Sarbel) (2006-2007)
 Boom (with Elli Kokkinou, Stamatis Gonidis, Yorgos Lianos) (2007)

Awards and nominations

References

External links

1985 births
21st-century American women singers
21st-century American singers
Adelphi University alumni
American expatriates in Greece
American women pop singers
American women singer-songwriters
American female models
American people of Greek descent
American singer-songwriters
Eurovision Song Contest entrants for Greece
Eurovision Song Contest entrants of 2008
Female models from New York (state)
Greek laïko singers
21st-century Greek women singers
Greek pop singers
Living people
Modern Greek-language singers
People from Long Island
People from West Hempstead, New York